may refer to: 
Yūbari, Hokkaidō, Japan
Yūbari District, Hokkaidō, Japan
Yūbari River in Hokkaidō, Japan
Yūbari Mountains in Hokkaidō, Japan
Mount Yūbari in Hokkaidō, Japan
Yubari Melon, a type of melon
Japanese cruiser Yūbari
Yubari-class destroyer escort